Alfred James Carver (22 March 1826 – 25 July 1909) was a noted educationalist and cleric who was Master of Dulwich College from 1858 to 1883.

Early life
Carver was born the son of James Carver. He was educated at St Paul's School and went on to Trinity College, Cambridge where he was the Bell Scholar in 1845 and the winner of the Burney Prize Essay. He received a first class degree in the Classical Tripos and Senior Optime Maths in 1849. He received his MA in 1852. From 1850 to 1853 he was a Fellow of Queens' College.

He married Eliza Peek (daughter of William Peek of the tea merchants Peek, Winch & Co.) on 19 July 1853 with whom he had two sons and five daughters. Both his sons and two of his daughter's husbands went to Dulwich College.

Career
Having completed his education he went on to become Surmaster from 1852 to 1858 at St Paul's School (London). He was also the University of Cambridge Examiner for the Classical Tripos between 1857 and 1858. He took up the post of Master of the College of God's Gift in Dulwich (at that time colloquially referred to as "Dulwich College") in 1858. What had been the 'College of God's Gift' became 'Alleyn's College of God's Gift' when, on 25 August 1857 the Dulwich College Act dissolved the existing cooperation and the charity was reconstituted with the new name. The first Master of the college in this new form was Alfred Carver, he was also the first Master not to share the name of the school's founder "Alleyn" (or latterly "Allen"). The educational college was split into an Upper and Lower school (based on syllabus differences, not age) both of which were under Carver's control. Under Carver, the formation of the school as one of the recognisable great Public Schools of England began. The buildings which the school now occupies were built. The present school colours and school magazine were established in the 1860s and 1870s, as were school societies such as Debating and Natural Science. By the time Canon Carver retired from the position of Master in 1882 Dulwich College was said to have expanded more rapidly in the previous 25 years than any other establishment and to be holding its own at universities, to have won a large number of places of honour in the Indian and Home Civil Service and at the Royal Military College of Woolwich and to be well represented amongst the public schools medals of the Royal Geographic Society and the prizes of the Art Schools of the Royal Academy.

In Carver's time, the college, despite a growing reputation, was the constant focus of pressure by the Charity Commissioners and other parties (including the Board of Governors and the outlying parishes named in Edward Alleyn's will) to reorganise it and divert much of its endowment to other schemes. Canon Carver resisted these pressures for many years finally winning an appeal in 1876 at the highest possible point (the Privy Council) where Lord Selbourne ruled in his favour. In 1882, the Charity Commissioners finally issued a scheme which Canon Carver found acceptable. This passed into law by Act of Parliament and resulted in the Upper and Lower schools being officially split into separate institutions. The Upper School became Dulwich College (officially for the first time) and the Lower became Alleyn's School. Both schools remained within the Alleyn's College of God's Gift charitable foundation.  Canon Carver retired at this point, being the first headmaster to be both appointed and retired by Act of Parliament.

As a cleric, he had been ordained as a deacon in 1853 and a priest in 1854. He was the curate of St Olave, Old Jewry from 1854 to 1857 and in 1861 received his Doctorate of Divinity. In 1882 he was made the Honorary Canon of Rochester.

He also served as chairman of James Allen's Girls' School, another of the foundation schools of which Dulwich College is a part, and he was Vice President of the Royal Naval School, Eltham.

Carver died at "Lynnhurst", his home in Streatham, on 25 July 1909. He is remembered at Dulwich College by the organ in the Great Hall, a wing of the old school library and reredos of the chapel. A temporary boarding house was also named after him.  He was buried at West Norwood Cemetery where he has an elaborate memorial, near the former site of the episcopal chapel.   A portrait of Carver by Samuel Melton Melton Fisher,R.A.,O.A., painted in 1882 is in the collection of Dulwich Picture Gallery.

Further reading
Hodges, S, (1981), God's Gift: A Living History of Dulwich College, (Heinemann: London)

References

1826 births
1909 deaths
Alumni of Trinity College, Cambridge
People educated at St Paul's School, London
English educational theorists
Masters of Dulwich College
Masters of the College of God's Gift
Burials at West Norwood Cemetery
Fellows of Queens' College, Cambridge